Owosso may refer to a location in the United States:

 Owosso, Michigan, a city in Shiawassee County
 Owosso Township, Michigan, adjacent to the city